SS Manitoulin was a Great Lakes passenger steamship. She was built in 1889 as Modjeska, and renamed Manitoulin in 1927 after a major refit. She was laid up in 1949 and scrapped in 1953.

Building
Napier, Shanks and Bell built Modjeska in Yoker, Glasgow, Scotland, launching her on 13 April 1889. She was a twin-screw steamship, and each of her screws was driven by a triple-expansion steam engine built by Dunsmuir and Jackson Ltd. of Govan. Between them her twin engines were rated at 166 NHP.

Modjeska
Modjeska was an excursion steamer on Lake Ontario. Her first owner was the Hamilton Steamboat Co Ltd, which registered her in Hamilton, Ontario. Her United Kingdom official number was 96058. Her ownership passed to the Niagara Steam Navigation Co Ltd in 1911 and Canada Steamship Lines Ltd in 1915.

Manitoulin

In 1926 the Owen Sound Transportation Company acquired Modjeska in damaged condition, had her refitted, renamed her Manitoulin and moved her to Owen Sound.

In 1949 Manitoulin was laid up, and in 1950  replaced her.
 Manitoulin was stripped in 1951 at Port Dalhousie, Ontario and scrapped in late 1953 at Port Weller Dry Docks.

References

Bibliography

1889 ships
Ferries of the Owen Sound Transportation Company
Ships built in Glasgow
Steamships of Canada
Transport in Manitoulin District